Madhav Singh Solanki (30 July 1927 – 9 January 2021) was a leader of Indian National Congress party who served as External Affairs minister of India. He served also as the Chief Minister of Gujarat three times. He was known for KHAM theory by which he came to power in Gujarat in 1980s.

Early life 
Madhav was born on 30 July 1927 in a Koli family of Gujarat. His eldest son, Bharatsinh Madhavsinh Solanki, is also a politician.

Career
In 1981, the Government of Gujarat headed by the chief minister Solanki, introduced the reservation for socially and economically backward classes based on recommendations of Bakshi Commission. It resulted in anti-reservation agitation across the state which spilled over in riots resulting in more than hundred deaths. Solanki resigned in 1985 but later returned to power winning 149 out of 182 assembly seats [a record till BJP's victory in 2022 Assembly Elections]. He was supported by Kshatriya, Harijan, Adivasi and Muslims; called collectively as KHAM formula. It resulted in other communities losing the political influence.

Bofors
According to the CBI, Solanki visited Davos in Switzerland in 1992 to attend the World Economic Forum where he allegedly met the Swiss foreign minister Rene Felber and told him that "inquiries conducted into the scam in India had failed to produce any result and that the request for mutual assistance was based on political considerations".

See also 
 List of Koli people
 List of Koli states and clans

References

|-

|-

|-

|-

External links
 Govt to press for early Presidential sanction
 Communalist outrages in Gujarat  

1927 births
2021 deaths
Indian National Congress politicians
Chief Ministers of Gujarat
People from Gujarat
Bofors scandal
Ministers for External Affairs of India
Koli people
Leaders of the Opposition in Gujarat
Chief ministers from Indian National Congress
Solanki Madhav Singh
Gujarat MLAs 1980–1985
Gujarat MLAs 1985–1990
Indian National Congress politicians from Gujarat